Mansilla de las Mulas, Mansiella in Leonese language, is a municipality located in the province of León, Castile and León, Spain. According to the 2010 census (INE), the municipality has a population of 1,913 inhabitants.

The town is on the French Way the most popular path of the Camino de Santiago.

Leonese Ethnographic Museum is located in this village.

Language
Mansilla City Council promotes Leonese language courses.

See also
 Leonese language
 Kingdom of León
 Count of Mansilla

References

Municipalities in the Province of León